Predator is a wooden roller coaster located at Six Flags Darien Lake. It was designed by Curtis D. Summers and built by Dinn Corporation and opened on May 25, 1990.

Design
The coaster is a double out-and-back design and does so in a fairly confined space. The main section of the coaster runs along the lake to its north.

Renovations and upgrades
At the end of the summer of 2006, the last year of Darien Lake being owned by Six Flags, a major re-tracking took place and some wood was replaced on the ride to help make it more enjoyable for guests. In 2001, during an earlier tracking job, part of the queue line was removed to make way for an expanded seating area for the nearby food stand.

In 2010, Darien Lake purchased 12 PTC articulated cars from Holiday World, where they were used on The Voyage. These trains replaced the original PTC trailer-style trains which were known to have an extremely rough ride. With the closure  of Raging Wolf Bobs at the defunct Geauga Lake in 2007, The Predator was the last roller coaster to operate with PTC trailered trains.

In 2020, it was revealed that Great Coasters International will be replacing some sections of Predator's track with their new steel Titan Track.

References

Six Flags Darien Lake
Roller coasters in New York (state)
Roller coasters introduced in 1990
Predator, The
Roller coasters operated by Herschend Family Entertainment